The Sona sea catfish, also called the marine catfish or the dusky catfish, (Sciades sona) is a species of catfish in the family Ariidae. It was described by Francis Buchanan-Hamilton in 1822, originally under the genus Pimelodus. It inhabits rivers, estuaries and marine coasts around Pakistan, Indonesia, Polynesia and Thailand. Its maximum known life expectancy is 6 years. Males and females mate for life.

The Sona sea catfish feeds on finfish and benthic invertebrates. Its meat is marketed fresh, as well as dried and salted.

References

Ariidae
Taxa named by Francis Buchanan-Hamilton - 1822
Fish described in 1822